Eendracht (the Dutch word for "unity") is a canal and former branch of the river Scheldt in the Netherlands.

Eendracht or De Eendracht may also refer to:

Ships

 Eendracht (1615 ship), ship with which Dirk Hartog made the second recorded European landing in Australia
 Eendracht (1655 ship), flagship of United Provinces confederate navy
 Eendracht (1989 ship), Dutch ship built in 1989
 Eendracht class cruiser, a class of light cruisers

Windmills

 De Eendracht, Alkmaar, North Holland
 De Eendracht, Alphen aan den Rijn, South Holland
 De Eendracht, Anjum, Friesland
 De Eendracht, Dirksland,  South Holland
 De Eendracht, Gieterveen, Drenthe
 De Eendracht, Kimswerd, Friesland
 De Eendracht, Sebaldeburen, Groningen
 De Eendracht, three windmills in Leeuwarden

Other uses
 De Eendracht, Amsterdam, a neighborhood of Amsterdam, Netherlands
 General Industrial Union of Textiles and Clothing, Dutch trade union also known as "De Eendracht"
 Eendracht Aalst, a Belgian football club
 Eendrachtsland, one of the earliest names given to the country now known as Australia

See also
 Eendracht maakt macht (Unity makes strength), national motto of the Dutch Republic
 List of windmills in the Netherlands